A primordial isocurvature baryon model (PIB model) is a theoretical model describing the development of the early universe. It may be contrasted with the cold dark matter model (CDM model). The PIB model was proposed in 1987 by Jim Peebles as an alternative to the CDM model, which does not necessitate the existence of exotic dark matter. PIB models, which ascribe all cosmic density perturbations to isocurvature modes, predict results that are inconsistent with the observational data.

See also
Lambda-CDM model

Footnotes

Bibliography

External links 
 http://ned.ipac.caltech.edu/level5/March02/Ratra/Ratra4_2_12.html

Physical cosmology